Rachel (or Rachael) was launched at Whitby in 1783. She primarily traded with the Baltic, but made some voyages as a West Indiaman. A gale caused her crew to abandon her near Memel in October 1817.

Career
Rachel first appeared in Lloyd's Register (LR) in 1783 with F.White, master, J.Coulson, owner, and trade Whitby–Norway.

On 20 May 1815 as Rachel, Price, master, was returning to Whitby from Memel she got on shore. She was gotten off with little damage.

Fate
Lloyd's List reported that a gale near Memel on 2 October 1817 had resulted in the loss of Rachel, of Whitby, and some other vessels. The crews had been saved. Reportedly, she drifted ashore on the coast of Ireland, derelict.

Citations

References
 

1783 ships
Ships built in Whitby
Age of Sail merchant ships of England
Maritime incidents in 1817